Scrobipalpa rebeli is a moth of the family Gelechiidae. It is found in Austria, Italy, Ukraine and the Krasnoyarsk region in southern Siberia. It is also present in China (Shaanxi) and Japan.

The larvae feed on Artemisia campestris.

Subspecies
Scrobipalpa rebeli rebeli
Scrobipalpa rebeli fuscella Klimesch, 1938

References

Moths described in 1914
Scrobipalpa
Moths of Japan
Moths of Europe